Five ships of the French Navy have borne the name Scipion in honour of Scipio Africanus.

French ships named Scipion 
 , a 74-gun ship of the line, lead ship of her class (1779–1782)
 , a 74-gun  (1790–1793)
 , an 80-gun ship of the line renamed Scipion in 1794, lead ship of her class (1766–1795)
 ,  a 74-gun Téméraire-class ship of the line ordered in 1798 as Orient, renamed in 1801 and captured by the British in 1805
 , an 80-gun ship of the line (1813–1846)

Notes and references

Notes

References

Bibliography 
 

French Navy ship names

fr:Scipion#Navires